γ-Melanocyte-stimulating hormone (γ-MSH) is an endogenous peptide hormone and neuropeptide. It is a melanocortin, specifically, one of the three types of melanocyte-stimulating hormone (MSH), and is produced from proopiomelanocortin (POMC). It is an agonist of the MC1, MC3, MC4, and MC5 receptors. It exists in three forms, γ1-MSH, γ2-MSH, and γ3-MSH.

Gamma-MSH regulated cardiovascular functions. Gama-MSH effects are measured through the effects it has on the central neural pathway dispersed throughout the kidney. It is not moderated based on tubular sodium transport. Gamma-MSH activates MC3R in renal tubular cells by limiting sodium absorption by inhibiting the central neural pathway.This regulates sodium balance and blood pressure. If MC3R is absent then there is resistance in γ-MSH which results in hypertension on HSD.

See also 
 α-Melanocyte-stimulating hormone
 β-Melanocyte-stimulating hormone
 Adrenocorticotropic hormone

References 

Human hormones
Melanocortin receptor agonists
Peptide hormones